Scythris friedeli is a moth of the family Scythrididae. It was described by Bengt Å. Bengtsson in 1997. It is found in Morocco and Iran.

References

friedeli
Moths described in 1997